Shelley Scott (born 16 March 1988) is an Australian rules footballer playing for Geelong in the AFL Women's competition. She was drafted by Melbourne with their sixth selection and forty-first overall in the 2016 AFL Women's draft. She missed one match during the season, the round five match against  due to a shoulder injury.

Melbourne signed Scott for the 2018 season during the trade period in May 2017.

In December 2018, Scott and Elise O'Dea were announced as Melbourne co-captains, while previous captain Daisy Pearce took maternity leave.

In June 2022, Scott was traded alongside Jacqueline Parry to Geelong in exchange for Jordan Ivey and pick 51.

References

External links 

1988 births
Living people
Melbourne Football Club (AFLW) players
Australian rules footballers from Victoria (Australia)
Victorian Women's Football League players